Hartha is a town in the district of Mittelsachsen, in Saxony, Germany. It is situated 11 km west of Döbeln, and 12 km north of Mittweida.

Personalities 
 Carl Grünberg (1847–1906), woven goods manufacturer in Hartha and politician (SPD), MdR, MdL (Kingdom of Saxony)
 Hans Jahn (1885–1960), politician of the Social Democratic Party of Germany, trade unionist and resistance fighter against the National Socialism
 Richard Müller (chemist) (1903–1999), chemist, discoverer of the silicone, Müller-Rochow synthesis

References 

Mittelsachsen